Arthur George Kelsey (21 April 1871 – 1955) was an English footballer who played in the Football League for West Bromwich Albion

References

1871 births
1955 deaths
English footballers
Association football forwards
English Football League players
Reading F.C. players
West Bromwich Albion F.C. players
Brierley Hill Alliance F.C. players
Wolverhampton Wanderers F.C. players